Gilbert Ansre is a Ghanaian linguist, academic, priest and Bible translation consultant.

Early life and education
He attended the Presbyterian Boys' Senior High School which was then known as the Presbyterian Boys' Secondary School at Odumase in the Eastern Region of Ghana. His university education was at the University of London where he graduated in 1966. The thesis he submitted was on "The grammatical units of Ewe : a study of their structure, classes and systems".

Career
He worked at the University of Ghana where he was a professor in Linguistics. He first set up and led the Department of Linguistics at the University of Ghana. He was the Master of Akuafo Hall of the university between 1975 and 1979. His area of interest includes tone and syntax of the Ewe language.

Ansre has also lectured at the Good News Theological College and Seminary at Dodowa in the Greater Accra Region.

Gilbert Ansre is an ordained reverend minister of the Evangelical Presbyterian Church, Ghana.

Bible translation
Ansre has been actively involved with Bible Translation work in Ghana and Togo. He was the Technical Advisor to the NYALOTA project to develop the Nyagbo, Tafi and Logba languages in the Volta Region of Ghana into written form. In 2017, he was the Chairman of the joint technical committee of the Bible Society of Ghana and GIILBT to analyze the Bible Translation needs of Ghana. He has been active in the work of the GILLBT especially in the area of translation of the Bible into various West African Languages. This has included the Ewe language, his own language as well as thirteen others.

Honours
The Trinity Theological Seminary, Legon has an academic chair established in honour of Ansre and Kwesi Dickson. This is the Kwesi Disckson-Gilbert Ansre Distinguished Chair of Biblical Exegesis & Mother Tongue Hermeneutics.
The contribution of Gilbert Ansre to the development of Ghanaian languages was recognised by the Ghana Institute of Linguistics, Literacy and Bible Translation (GILLBT), which awarded him the "Kwame Nkrumah African Genius award for African Languages" in February 2015 in Accra.

Family
Gilbert Ansre was named after his father, Gilbert Bansah Ansre who was also a Presbyterian minister and was also a graduate of University of Edinburgh. His mother was Felicia Angelica Ansre (née Nane).

Publications

See also
Ghana Institute of Linguistics, Literacy and Bible Translation
Alan Stewart Duthie
Kwesi Dickson

References

External links
Google Scholar Citations

Year of birth missing (living people)
Living people
Place of birth missing (living people)
Academic staff of the University of Ghana
Linguists from Ghana
Ewe people
People from Volta Region
Alumni of SOAS University of London
Presbyterian Boys' Senior High School alumni
Ghanaian Presbyterians
Ghanaian theologians
Ghanaian clergy